Patrick Hounsell (born 7 June 1958) is a former New Zealand cricketer. He played four first-class matches for Auckland between 1987 and 1989.

See also
 List of Auckland representative cricketers

References

External links
 

1958 births
Living people
New Zealand cricketers
Auckland cricketers
Cricketers from Blenheim, New Zealand